ST Amiga Format was a computer magazine that covered the Atari ST and Amiga computers. It was published by Future plc to cover the ever growing market for the, then-new, 16-bit home computers. Issues were equally balanced with coverage for both Amiga and Atari ST systems. Issue 1 included a main feature 'ST or Amiga? The Choice is Yours', where the pros and cons for each machine was examined.

ST Amiga Format often included a floppy disk mounted on the cover, which used a unique dual format filesystem that could be read by both the Amiga and ST. The disks included game demos, software utilities, etc.

Regular features included tutorials (on both Amiga and ST), Gamebuster, Gold Dust (a rumours section), Desktop (tips and technical guide for the ST), Workbench (tips and technical guide for the Amiga), Escape Sequence (last page) and the usual news and letters pages.

Issue 13 (July 1989) was the last issue under the dual format.  The sale of sister magazine ACE freed up the staff necessary to split the magazine into two separate titles.  ST Format and Amiga Format were launched.

References

External links

 ST Amiga Format overview
 The ST Format Shrine
 Archived ST Amiga Format magazines on the Internet Archive

Atari ST magazines
Amiga magazines
Defunct computer magazines published in the United Kingdom
Magazines established in 1988
Magazines disestablished in 1989
Mass media in Bath, Somerset
Video game magazines published in the United Kingdom